Street Food is an American documentary that premiered on Netflix on April 26, 2019, created by David Gelb and Brian McGinn, exploring street food around the world. Archival footage is combined with face-to-face interviews and follows street food chefs and their history, which is intertwined with the big picture of how influential street food is on their native country.

Episodes

Volume 1: Asia

Volume 2: Latin America

Volume 3: USA

Release
The first season was released on April 26, 2019, on Netflix; the second season on July 21, 2020;and the third season on July 26, 2022.

Reception
Review aggregator Rotten Tomatoes reported an approval rating of 100% based on 8 reviews, with an average rating of 8/10 for the first volume. For the second volume, review aggregator Rotten Tomatoes reported an approval rating of 83% based on 6 reviews, with an average rating of 6.5/10.

See also
 List of Asian cuisines 
 Featured: Filipino cuisine, Indian cuisine, Indonesian cuisine, Japanese cuisine, Korean cuisine, Singaporean cuisine, Taiwanese cuisine, Thai cuisine, Vietnamese cuisine
 Latin American cuisine 
 Featured: Argentine cuisine, Bolivian cuisine, Brazilian cuisine, Colombian cuisine, Oaxacan cuisine, Peruvian cuisine
 List of street foods
 List of cuisines

References

External links
Volume 1: Asia 
 
 
Volume 2: Latin America 
 
 

2019 American television series debuts
2010s American documentary television series
English-language Netflix original programming
Netflix original documentary television series
Television series by Boardwalk Pictures